"Coco" is a song by American rapper 24kGoldn, featuring vocals from DaBaby. It was released as the second single from 24kGoldn's debut studio album, El Dorado (2021), on December 4, 2020.

Background and composition
24kGoldn announced the song via social media on December 1, 2020.  Complex described the song as a fusion of "pop, trap, R&B, and more."  The song's title is a reference to fashion brand Chanel.

Music video
The official music video, directed by Cole Bennett, was released on December 16, 2020.  The visual sees the two artists in a "winter wonderland" with DaBaby dressed as Santa Claus.

Personnel
Credits adapted from Tidal.
 24kGoldn – lead vocals, songwriting, lyrics
 DaBaby – featured vocals, songwriting, lyrics
 94Skrt – songwriting, lyrics, production, drums
 Omer Fedi – songwriting, lyrics, production, guitar
 Chris Galland – assistant engineer
 Jeremie Inhaber – assistant engineer
 Manny Marroquin – mixing engineer
 Robin Florent – mixing engineer

Charts

Certifications

Release history

References

2020 singles
2020 songs
24kGoldn songs
DaBaby songs
Songs written by DaBaby
Columbia Records singles
Songs written by 24kGoldn
Songs written by Omer Fedi